Who Killed the KLF? is a 2021 documentary film by Chris Atkins about The KLF.

The unauthorised documentary includes reconstructions of the band's dramatic gestures, played by actors. KLF members Jimmy Cauty and Bill Drummond refused to take part in the film or to authorise it. However, old interviews with them, recorded on audio cassettes, were used. Limited clips of their music were included under the fair dealing copyright exception. The KLF originally sought to block the film's release due to alleged copyright infringement, but later approved of the film.

Cast

Jimmy Cauty as self (archive footage; voice)
Carl Cox as self
Bill Drummond as self (archive footage; voice)
John Higgs as self
Alan Moore as self
Paul Oakenfold as self

Reception
The film received positive reviews. The Guardian gave it four stars, saying it was "a very entertaining guide through what has to be the strangest A-list pop career of modern times". Likewise, The Times also gave the film four stars. The Hollywood Reporter also praised the documentary, describing it as "highly entertaining".

Trivia
Director Chris Atkins had been working on the film since 2009, however production was halted after he received a five–year prison sentence in 2016 for tax fraud. After he moved to an open prison, he had a laptop sneaked in so he could start the editing process. When Atkins was released in December 2018, he said that the piece was "a rough cut that mostly resembled a radio play, with amazing audio commentary but nothing to look at" and within three weeks, he began to film reconstructions.

References

External links

The KLF
Documentary films about electronic music and musicians
Documentary films about pop music and musicians
2021 independent films
2020s English-language films
British documentary films
British biographical films
2021 films
2020s British films